Chris Pratt (born 1 August 1959) is an Australian sailor. He competed at the 1984 Summer Olympics and the 1988 Summer Olympics.

References

External links
 

1959 births
Living people
Australian male sailors (sport)
Olympic sailors of Australia
Sailors at the 1984 Summer Olympics – Finn
Sailors at the 1988 Summer Olympics – Finn
Place of birth missing (living people)
20th-century Australian people